Patrick Aloysius McFarland (born December 7, 1951) is an American former professional basketball player. He played in the American Basketball Association (ABA) for the Denver Rockets / Nuggets and San Diego Sails. McFarland scored 947 points in his ABA career.

McFarland grew up in Willingboro Township, New Jersey where he attended John F. Kennedy High School.

References

External links
Saint Joseph's University bio

1951 births
Living people
American men's basketball players
Basketball players from New Jersey
Basketball players from Philadelphia
Denver Nuggets players
Denver Rockets draft picks
Denver Rockets players
New York Knicks draft picks
People from Willingboro Township, New Jersey
Saint Joseph's Hawks men's basketball players
San Diego Sails players
Shooting guards